Isaac Carcelén Valencia (born 23 April 1993), commonly known as Iza, is a Spanish professional footballer who plays for Cádiz CF as either a right back or a right winger.

Club career
Born in El Puerto de Santa María, Cádiz, Andalusia, Iza was a Real Betis' youth graduate. He made his senior debuts with the reserves in 2011, in Segunda División B.

On 1 July 2014, after being an undisputed starter for the B-team in its promotion from Tercera División, Iza renewed his contract for a further year, being included in the first team's pre-season late in the month. He was also regularly used during the 2014–15 campaign, appearing in 33 matches and scoring two goals.

On 6 July 2015 Iza moved to Segunda División with Real Zaragoza, after agreeing to a three-year deal. He made his professional debut on 3 October, coming on as a half-time substitute for Rubén in a 1–0 home win against Deportivo Alavés.

Iza scored his first professional goal on 15 December 2015, netting his side's only in a 3–1 loss at Gimnàstic de Tarragona. On 9 July 2017, Cultural y Deportiva Leonesa and Zaragoza reached an agreement for the transfer of Isaac.

On 21 July 2018, Iza signed for CF Rayo Majadahonda still in the second division. On 1 July of the following year, he agreed to a three-year deal with Cádiz CF in the same category.

Career statistics

References

External links

Beticopedia profile 

1993 births
Living people
People from El Puerto de Santa María
Sportspeople from the Province of Cádiz
Spanish footballers
Footballers from Andalusia
Association football defenders
Association football wingers
La Liga players
Segunda División players
Segunda División B players
Tercera División players
Betis Deportivo Balompié footballers
Real Zaragoza players
Cultural Leonesa footballers
CF Rayo Majadahonda players
Cádiz CF players